The Provence Alps and Prealps (Alpes et Préalpes de Provence in French) are a mountain range in the south-western part of the Alps, located in Provence-Alpes-Côte d'Azur (France). Provence Alps and Prealps encompass the south-western area of the French Prealps.

Etymology
The Provence is a historical region nowadays part of the administrative région of Provence-Alpes-Côte d'Azur.

Geography
Administratively the range belongs to the French departments of Vaucluse, Alpes-Maritimes and Alpes-de-Haute-Provence.

The western slopes of the range are drained by the Rhone river through the Durance and other tributaries while its south-eastern part is drained by the Var and several smaller rivers that flow directly to the Mediterranean Sea.

Notable summits

Some notable summits of the range are:

References

Maps
 French official cartography (Institut Géographique National - IGN); on-line version: www.geoportail.fr

Mountain ranges of the Alps
Mountain ranges of Provence-Alpes-Côte d'Azur